The Hand drill is a hieroglyph, (and tool), used in ancient Egypt from the earliest dynasties. As a hieroglyph, it can also be used as a determinative for words related to the profession of vase, bowl, pot-making, etc., typically from fine-grained, colorful rare stone, for example unguent jars. The size of drills was small-to-large, small for small unguent jars, and large for more massive, grain-storing pottery. The original jars found in tombs were more often used for ceremonial usages, presumably the reason they are found as grave goods or tomb offerings.

Hand drill hieroglyph and tool explanation

The hand drill was a vertical type of weighted, and counterbalanced boring bar, (used today in horizontal lathe-work boring, for example: rifle tubes). The hieroglyph shows the weights used as pictured on temple reliefs; the weight of the stones does the tool work, and the artisan simply supplies the rotational motion of the tool, for boring the hole.

Of note: with the weighted device, the Egyptians were performing a lathe operation long before the invention. Instead of the lathe-(massive metal: weight and forces) doing the work, essentially the Egyptians were using a form of a vertical lathe-using gravity-weights, with the boring bar doing the cutting.

See also
Gardiner's Sign List#U. Agriculture, Crafts, and Professions
List of Egyptian hieroglyphs

References
Budge.  An Egyptian Hieroglyphic Dictionary, E.A.Wallace Budge, (Dover Publications), c 1978, (c 1920), Dover edition, 1978. (In two volumes) (softcover)

External links

Egyptian hieroglyphs: arts and trades
Egyptian hieroglyphs: agriculture-crafts-and-professions

Egyptian artefact types